Mapogo Rio "Yanga" Gcilisha Maphakane (born 23 August 1988), is a South African football (soccer) defender who currently plays for Tornado F.C. in the SAFA Second Division.

Career 
Throughout his career played in the National First Division clubs. In 2014, he moved to play in the SAFA Second Division club Tornado F.C. 18 January 2015 entered the field in the starting lineup in the Nedbank Cup match against Orlando Pirates, where he earned his second yellow card and was sent off.

External links

References

1988 births
Living people
Association football defenders
F.C. AK players
South African soccer players
Hanover Park F.C. players